Pavlos Karvounis (born 5 December 2002) is a Greek professional footballer who plays as a midfielder for Super League 2 club Panathinaikos B.

References

2002 births
Living people
Super League Greece 2 players
Panathinaikos F.C. players
Association football midfielders
Footballers from Athens
Greek footballers
Panathinaikos F.C. B players